The Sweden women's national rugby union team are a national sporting side of Sweden, representing them at rugby union. The side first played in 1984.

History 
Sweden are considered one of the pioneers of women’s test rugby. In 2017, they returned to the international 15s scene after a three-year absence.

Sweden won the 2021–2022 Rugby Europe Women's Trophy.

Records

Overall 

(Full internationals only)

World Cup

Players

Recent squad

See also
 Rugby union in Sweden

References

External links 
Svenska Rugbyförbundet - Official site 

Nat
European national women's rugby union teams
Rugby union